Mù Qīng (March 15, 1921 – October 11, 2003) was a Chinese journalist and politician. He was known for his contributions to Chinese journalism in the 20th century. He was a reporter at Xinhua News Agency for decades before becoming its President. Most of his works were published in journalism textbooks and have been used widely throughout China.

Biography

Youth
Mu was born in Bengbu, Anhui in 1921. After attending secondary school in Henan he joined the Eighth Route Army, and in 1937, at the age of 16, he was responsible for a number of propaganda works. He joined the Communist Party of China in 1939 and entered the Lu Xun Academy of Art a year later.

War Correspondent
Mu commenced his career in journalism as a war correspondent in Jiefang Daily in the year 1942. Early in his career, he engaged in covering news stories on war, including the Sino-Japanese War (1937–1945) and the Chinese Civil War. After Japan had surrendered in 1945, Mu was sent to the North-eastern China and established Dongfang Daily.

Career in Xinhua
After the founding of the People's Republic of China (PRC) in 1949, Mu was promoted to a senior level in the Xinhua News Agency. In 1951, Mu was given the title of Vice President for the Xinhua Headquarters in Beijing. Later in 1955, he moved from the Headquarters to the Xinhua News Agency main office in Shanghai, where he was President for the next three years.

In 1982, Mu became the Chief President of Xinhua until his retirement in 1992. On October 11, 2003 he died from lung cancer in Beijing.

Concern for the poor 

Mu was known for his interest in reporting on the circumstances of Chinese peasants. He visited different parts of China frequently and interviewed the poverty stricken communities about their daily experiences. His goal was to make the central government aware of the needs of those who are underprivileged.

Mu wrote stories about Communist Party and local government officials he saw as role models. The most famous of these is "Jiao Yulu: A Good Example of the Secretaries of the County Committee of the Communist Party", in which Mu recorded the work done by Jiao Yulu in helping the peasants during a time of natural disaster.

Mu's Principles of Journalism
Throughout Mu's career in journalism, there are several principles which he has upheld.

Importance of Investigation 
Mu believed that investigative journalism is a journalist's responsibility to the readers. He thought that investigation is essential in ensuring that the facts reported are accurate. Journalists must be constantly alert and insist on investigation so that the news reported would be honest and truthful.

Mu believed that investigation is so important that it sustains the life of a journalist as a journalist. He also thought that without investigation, news would lose its energy, orientation and meaning. On the other hand, Mu resisted making reports with people and stories which were fictional.

Importance of Raising Questions 
Mu believed that in order to have accurate news reporting, journalists have to be constantly ready to challenge the information collected. Instead of merely reporting facts in a narrative way, journalists are to reveal to the readers the significance and meaning behind the news reports.

Mu thought that raising questions enable journalists to think more, investigate more, and discover more; only by doing these things, can journalists reach closer to the truth.

Importance of Reporting Up-to-date Social Problems 
Mu believed that journalists should discover more up-to-date social problems instead of reporting old problems. This could draw people's attention and motivate them to search for solutions. These reports could eventually help remove the obstacles to social development.

Mu stated that journalists should actively report social issues and policies which aroused great public concern. Transparency in major social issues enabled the public to get hold of more information and hence could react correspondingly. Consensus between the people and the government could be easily reached if the public understood the rationale behind each policy implemented by the government.

Mu's Influence on Journalism in China

Resisting Threats and Criticisms 
Apart from news writing, Mu was also famous for his directorship of the Xinhua News Agency. He helped defend independence of journalism during a period when biased news reporting was prevalent. When the Anti-Rightist Movement started in 1957, the Shanghai Office of Xinhua, under the leadership of Mu, was the only branch that did not engage in criticising the rightists.

Although Mu was under severe criticism during the Cultural Revolution, he upheld the principles. In 1975, Mu reported to Mao Zedong about opposition of Jiang Qing, leader of Gang of Four, towards Zhou Enlai and Deng Xiaoping once he got hold of the information from his reporters, ignoring the potential consequences that might have caused him.

Political Role of Xinhua 
Mu claimed that the Xinhua News Agency was a tool for Communist Party of China's (CPC) propaganda. It represented the Party and the People's Republic of China (PRC), and was also a medium for the promotion of Marxism and the CPC's orientation, direction and policies. He required all journalists of the Xinhua News Agency to work in conformity with the principles of the Party and the Central Government.

Claiming to be at the side of the proletariat, Mu heavily criticized the appearance of capitalism in Chinese journalism. Mu believed that the thoughts of liberation advocated by capitalism would lead to a denial of the CPC leadership. He constantly reminded the journalists in Xinhua to maintain absolute obedience towards the CPC.

Mu's strong stance helped preserve the political orientation of the whole of Xinhua News Agency.

Leading Xinhua to the World 
Mu's contribution to Xinhua's development had been widely recognized. He envisioned that for Xinhua would become an international news agency, it had to be more accurate and efficient in its news reporting, as well as to acquire a wider coverage on the news of developing countries.

Under the leadership of Mu, Xinhua endeavoured to give the world a Chinese voice, by developing its own perspective. Aiming at this goal, Mu introduced new strategies to the agency and improved on the standard of news reporting. He placed emphasis on the training of young reporters, and advocated the idea of searching for truth by reaching out to the lower class of society.

Mu's Contribution to Literature

Early Encounter with Literature 
When Mu was young, he was more interested in becoming a writer than a journalist. While he was studying in Lu Xun Academy of Art, his writing skills were honed as he spent a lot of effort on them. He learned theories of literature from many famous writers of modern China, e.g. Mao Dun and Zhou Yang, president of the Academy at that time. This essentially led to his literary style of news writing in his later career.

Relationship Between Journalism and Literature 
Mu's greatest contribution was his news writing and literature. He disagreed with people at that time who did not regard literary reportage as a kind of literature and he insisted that literary reportage should be based on real people and real life situations, rather than fiction.

His work, particularly about people, had incorporated various techniques of literature into news writing and had profound impacts on the development of literary reportage in China. His article "For Premier Zhou's Exhortation" was once selected as the Outstanding Literary Reportage in China and this proved the literary value of his journalistic works.

Mu's Contribution to Photography

First Encounter with Photography 
Mu had written many correspondences during the "war era", however he did not have the chance to take any photographs reflecting the real world he was writing about. In the 80s, with the advancement of technology, Mu started to take pictures during his journeys in different places.

Realistic Correspondences 
Mu liked to present his stories through his camera in a realistic way. He resisted reporting with second hand information. His photographs went with this principle as well.

Famous works by Mu Qing

Correspondences 
An Unfinished News Report
For Premier Zhou's Exhortation
Jiao Yulu – A Good Example of the Secretaries of the County Committee of the Communist Party
Judgement of history
Last Supper
Revolution has begun again!()
Save Africa()
Wang Jinxi the Iron Man()
Under the Leaning Tower

Books 
Ding ci yishu (2002)
Xinwen san lun (Talking about News) (1996)
Jiao yu lu (1980)
Mingdai minyao qinghua (With Tang Weijian) (2000)
Mu Qing sanwen xuan (1984)
Shi ge gongchandangyuan (10 Communists)
Weiyena de xuanlü (The Melody of Vienna) (1983)
Xiang zhong de hongqi(1950)
Xinwen gongzuo san lun (1983)
Zhongguo xin wenyi daxi, 1937–1949. Baogao wenxue ji (《中國新文藝大系, 1937–1949. 報告文學集》) (Edited by Mu Qing) (1996)
Zhongguo xin wenyi daxi, 1949–1966. Baogao wenxue ji (《中國新文藝大系, 1949–1966. 報告文學集》) (Edited by Mu Qing) (1987)

Photographic Work 
Selected photographic works of Mu Qing

Calligraphy 
Selected calligraphies of Mu Qing

Comments about Mu Qing 
A Comprehensive Interview with Mu()
A Famous and Kindhearted Journalist – Mu Qing()
A Memorable Journalist—Mu Qing()
An Interview with Mu()
Death of Mu Qing
Demoforum: Learn How to Make Friends from Mu Qing()
Mu Behind the Public
What Kind of Journalist does Mu Qing Belong to?()

External links 
Article on Mu Qing's profile from Beijing Youth Daily (北京青年報)
Quotes from Mu Qing
Webpage about Mu Qing from Shang Yao Bao Ye (商丘日報)
Webpage about Mu Qing from Xinhua News Agency's website

Chinese photojournalists
1921 births
2003 deaths
Deaths from lung cancer
Deaths from cancer in the People's Republic of China
Republic of China journalists
People's Republic of China journalists
People from Bengbu
Writers from Anhui
Xinhua News Agency people